Sarıpolat is a  village in Malkara district of Tekirdağ Province, Turkey,  It is situated in the eastern Thrace plains at . The population of the village is 216 as of 2011. The old name of this village is Teslim. It was a Bulgarian village during the Ottoman Empire era. But after the Second Balkan War the Bulgarian population was forced to leave the settlement.

References

Villages in Tekirdağ Province